The Desert Rose Band is the debut studio album by the American country rock group of the same name. It was released June 2, 1987 via MCA/Curb. The album peaked at #24 on the Top Country Albums chart.

Track listing

Personnel

The Desert Rose Band
Bill Bryson- bass guitar, background vocals
Steve Duncan- drums, percussion
Chris Hillman- acoustic guitar, lead vocals
John Jorgenson- 6-string bass guitar, acoustic guitar, electric guitar, mandolin, background vocals
JayDee Maness- pedal steel guitar
Herb Pedersen- acoustic guitar, background vocals, lead vocals on "Once More"

Chart performance

References

1987 debut albums
The Desert Rose Band albums
MCA Records albums
Curb Records albums
Albums produced by Paul Worley